Plasmodium floridense is a parasite of the genus Plasmodium subgenus Lacertaemoba. As in all Plasmodium species, P. floridense has both vertebrate and insect hosts. The vertebrate hosts for this parasite are lizards.

Description 
This species was described by Thompson and Huff in 1944.

Schizonts are 1.5 -2.0 times the size of the nucleus of an uninfected erythrocyte. They produce 8-24 merozoites.

The gametocytes are of a similar size.

Distribution 
This organism is found in an area stretching continuously from the southern United States to Panama. It is also found in the Caribbean.

Hosts 

It infects lizards of the genera Anolis (Anolis carolinensis, Anolis gundlachi Anolis sabanus, Anolis sagrei) and Sceloporus undulatus.

The prevalence of infection in Anolis sagrei in Florida is high (46%) but the median parasitaemia in infected hosts is low (0.3%).

References 

floridense